Vazneh Sar may refer to:
 Vazneh Sar, Gilan
 Vazneh Sar, Zanjan